New Cassel was a short-lived Main Line Long Island Rail Road station stop. New Cassel was developed as a settlement for immigrant Germans in the summer of 1870 and was named after the German capital Hesse. The site made up , partially the farm of the late Gilbert Baldwin. There was no known depot building. The station first appeared on the timetable of November 1875 and was last listed in March 1876.

References

External links
Earliest stations of the LIRR (Unofficial Long Island Rail Road History Website)

Former Long Island Rail Road stations in Nassau County, New York
Railway stations in the United States opened in 1875
Railway stations closed in 1876